The James Dixon House (also known as Military View Farm) is a historic farmhouse located near Milford, Riley County, Kansas.

Description and history 
It was the originally the home of James Thomas Dixon, a farmer, stock raiser and local postmaster. Dixon began building the house in the 1870s and moved into the structure in late 1880 with his family. The two-story house was built at a cost of $10,000 out of rusticated limestone block and is designed in an Italianate style. The house has sometimes been called Military View Farm, because it was located on a hilltop overlooking Fort Riley. The house was restored in 1993 and 1994 and was listed on the National Register of Historic Places on April 1, 1998.

References

Houses in Geary County, Kansas
Houses completed in 1881
Houses on the National Register of Historic Places in Kansas
Italianate architecture in Kansas
National Register of Historic Places in Geary County, Kansas
1881 establishments in Kansas